Windward is the direction upwind from the point of reference, alternatively the direction from which the wind is coming.

Windward may also refer to:

Places 
 Windward High School, a school in Bellingham, Washington, United States
 Windward Islands, in the West Indies
 Windward Islands (Society Islands), the eastern group of the Society Islands in French Polynesia
 Windward Mall, an enclosed shopping center located in Kāneʻohe, Hawaiʻi
 Windward Passage, a strait in the Caribbean Sea
 Windward River, a river in Fiordland, New Zealand
 Windward School, a school in Los Angeles, California, United States
 Windward Viaducts, highway viaducts on the island of O‘ahu

Organizations 
 Windward Express, airline company
 Windward Performance, aircraft design house and manufacturer
 Windward Studios, software development company

Other 
 MS Windward, a cruise ship